Md. Ramjan Ali was an Indian politician. He was elected as MLA of Goalpokhar Vidhan Sabha Constituency in West Bengal Legislative Assembly in 1977, 1982, 1987 and 1991. He was murdered in 1994 in MLA Hostel of Kolkata. His son Ali Imran Ramz was elected thrice as 
a member of West Bengal Legislative Assembly.

References

1994 deaths
All India Forward Bloc politicians
West Bengal MLAs 1977–1982
West Bengal MLAs 1982–1987
West Bengal MLAs 1987–1991
West Bengal MLAs 1991–1996
Year of birth missing
20th-century Bengalis
21st-century Bengalis
People from Uttar Dinajpur district